Agrapha is a genus of moths of the family Noctuidae erected by Jacob Hübner in 1821.

Species
as per
 Agrapha adiaphora  (Dufay 1974)
 Agrapha agnata (Staudinger 1892)
 Agrapha ahenea Hubner 1821
 Agrapha albostriata (Bremer & Grey 1853)
 Agrapha aurisuta (Dufay 1968)
 Agrapha duboisi Barbut, 2008
 Agrapha epargyra (Dufay 1968)
 Agrapha eugrapha (Hampson 1913)
 Agrapha furcifera (Walker 1858)
 Agrapha gammaloba (Hampson 1910)
 Agrapha gigantea Barbut, 2008
 Agrapha griveaudi (Dufay 1968)
 Agrapha herbuloti (Dufay 1982)
 Agrapha ichinosei (Dufay 1965)
 Agrapha laqueta (Dufay 1968)
 Agrapha latistigma (Prout 1922)
 Agrapha leucostigma (Dufay 1968)
 Agrapha meretricia Schaus, 1911
 Agrapha micans (Dufay 1968)
 Agrapha nigra Barbut, 2008
 Agrapha orbifer (Guenée 1865)
 Agrapha pauliana (Dufay 1968)
 Agrapha placida (Moore 1884)
 Agrapha rhodographa (Dufay 1968)
 Agrapha seyrigi (Dufay 1968)
 Agrapha sigillata (Dufay 1970)
 Agrapha tarassota (Hampson 1913)
 Agrapha vermiculata (Dufay 1970)

References

 
 Barbut, J. (2008). Bulletin de la Société entomologique de France 113(1): 73-78.
 Dufay (1968). Bulletin mensuel de la Société linnéenne de Lyon 37: 204.
 Hübner (1821). Verzeichniss bekannter Schmettlinge (16): 250.
 
 Schaus (1911). Annals and Magazine of Natural History (8)7: 50.
 Walker [1858]. List of the Specimens of Lepidopterous Insects in the Collection of the British Museum 12: 915.

Plusiinae
Noctuoidea genera